Kungsgatan (Swedish for "King's Street") is a street address in central Stockholm.

It was formerly a red-light district and is currently a busy shopping street.

At its western end it is connected to Kungsholmen by Kungsbron bridge, from where it stretches east to Stureplan public square.  It is intercepted by the streets Vasagatan, Drottninggatan, and Sveavägen.  Two streets pass over it: Malmskillnadsgatan on Malmskillnadsbron bridge and Regeringsgatan on the Bridge of Regeringsgatan.

Kungsgatan passes by Hötorget public square where Stockholm Concert Hall is located.  It is also flanked by two buildings, the Kungstorn (King's towers), each about 60 metres tall.

Kungsgatan was dug through the Brunkebergsåsen esker (a natural ridge) in the early 20th century and inaugurated in 1911.  Today it is a lively shopping street flanked by cinemas, cafés, and other shopping facilities.

Hötorget station, on the Green line of the Stockholm metro, is located at the intersection where Kungsgatan crosses Sveavägen. Between its opening in 1952 and 1957, the station was named Kungsgatan.

See also 
 Geography of Stockholm

References 

Streets in Stockholm